Henry Thomas Hamblin (19 March 1873 – 28 October 1958) was an English mystic and New Thought author.

Spiritual teaching

The essence of Hamblin's mystical experience and philosophy was of the omnipresence, omnipotence and all-goodness of God ("The Kingdom or realm of God is with us now and always").  He believed that "abounding health, sufficiency of supply, achievement, accomplishment and joy indescribable are the normal state for man.", and that, to achieve this state, man needed to come into "harmony with Cosmic Law". Over time the emphasis of Hamblin's written work changed from showing people how to change their lives through right thought and faith, to teaching them how to find a living consciousness of God for himself alone.

Hamblin's work is continued to this day through the Hamblin Trust, a registered charity which publishes his books and the magazine New Vision (founded in 1921). The trust, set in three acres of gardens in Bosham, West Sussex, is also a venue for organisations and events promoting healthy living and personal development.

Selected works
The Fundamentals of True Success (1924)
Right Thinking and its Application to Inward Attainment and Outward Achievement (1921)
Dynamic Thought : Harmony, Health, Success through the Power of Right Thinking (3 editions published between 1921 and 1923)
Divine Adjustment : How Divine Law works in our life (1937)
The Life of the Spirit (6 editions published between 1920 and 2012)
Tagiĝas [in Esperanto] (F.H. Emptage, College Press, Deal, Kent, no date)
Life Without Strain (5 editions published between 1941 and 1974)
The Power of Thought (1920) 
The Message of a Flower (10 editions published between 1921 and 1928) 
My Search for Truth (1938)
The Story of My Life (Science of Thought Press 1947 – published for private circulation only)
The Way of the Practical Mystic (Polair Publishing, 2004)
Within You is the Power (1953)

References

Further reading
 Worstell, Dr. Robert C. Secrets to the Laws of Attraction (Worstell foundation) p 89.

External links
The Hamblin Trust
 
Hamblin Trust (Chidham and Hambrook community info)

1873 births
1958 deaths
20th-century Christian mystics
English male writers
English Christian mystics
English spiritual writers
New Thought mystics
New Thought writers
People from Walworth
People from Bosham